The following is a list of 2019 box office number-one films in Italy.

References 

2019
Italy
2019 in Italian cinema